Søren Klitgaard Kristensen (born 13 May 1971) is a former Danish cricketer.  Kristensen was a right-handed batsman who bowled slow left-arm orthodox.  He was born at Aalborg, North Jutland County.

Kristensen made his debut for Denmark in international cricket in the 1997 ICC Trophy against Malaysia.  He played 9 matches in that year's competition, the last of which came against the Netherlands.  Kristensen made his List A debut for Denmark in the 2000 ICC Emerging Nations Tournament against Zimbabwe A.  During the tournament he played 4 further List A matches against the Netherlands, Scotland, Ireland and Kenya.  These were Kristensen's only List A appearances for Denmark.  In his 5 List A matches for Denmark, he scored 24 runs at a batting average of 8.00, with a high score of 13.  With the ball he took 2 wickets at a bowling average of 51.00, with best figures of 1/14.

References

External links
Mogens Dahl Nielsen at ESPNcricinfo
Mogens Dahl Nielsen at CricketArchive

1971 births
Living people
Sportspeople from Aalborg
Danish cricketers